Sarah Emily Andrews is an Australian politician. She has been a Labor Party member of the South Australian House of Assembly since the 2022 state election, representing Gibson. She defeated former transport minister Corey Wingard who had previously held the seat with a margin of 10%.

Andrews was previously the state director of Professionals Australia, the union representing science, technology and engineering professionals.

References 

Living people
Members of the South Australian House of Assembly
Women members of the South Australian House of Assembly
21st-century Australian politicians
21st-century Australian women politicians
Australian Labor Party members of the Parliament of South Australia
Year of birth missing (living people)
Australian women trade unionists
Australian trade unionists